Now and Forever is a 1956 British drama film directed by Mario Zampi and starring Janette Scott, Vernon Gray and Kay Walsh. It is based on the play The Orchard Walls by R.F. Delderfield, and was Scott's first adult role after a career as a child star in Britain. The screenplay concerns an upper-class girl who becomes romantically involved with a garage mechanic, and they head for Gretna Green to elope.

Plot
Set in a market town in central England, Janette Grant is the 17 year old daughter of a wealthy, divorced couple who's lonely as her father rarely visits and her mother never finds time for her. She comes downstairs, ready to go to a musical performance at school. Expecting her mother to take her and give her support, Janette is upset that she decides to participate in a golf club competition as the slot just opened up.

Mrs. Grant contacts Mellingham Motors to order a lift for Janette. When Mike Pritchard arrives to collect her, he overhears her begging her moral support as she fears she might freeze up. Janette asks him to turn around, but he refuses.

On stage, at first Janette is blocked. Looking out for a friendly face, she spots Mike. His encouragement helps her push past the stage fright, and she performs beautifully. Although the cost was not included, Mike offers to drive her home. On the way, they share info about each other. Mike has finished school and works in his dad's garage doing the grunt work and owns his own car, which he has restored. Janette tells him that she has two terms left and that her dad, who she gets on with well, moved to Ireland after the divorce so she only sees him twice a year.

Mike invites Janette to a dance in the town hall, which she declines as she thought she'd be having dinner with her mother to tell her about the performance. However, she has already gone, and will be out all evening. Janette dresses up, showing up to dance. They are having a good time when a creepy man won't leave her alone, so Mike fights him and they are asked to leave. Mike has Janette back in time so that she can sneak into her mom's without getting caught. 

The next morning, her mother cooly states that her dad has died of a heart attack. Although she is devastated, her mother refuses to let her stay home from school and tells her it's best to carry on as normal. Distracted in class, Janette's teacher chastises her and sends her from class. In a saddened stupor, Janelle wanders up the school's tower and Mike follows her up as he'd seen her from a distance. Seeing how unhappy she looks he asks what's wrong and she bursts out with the news about her father, saying he was the only one, but he declares she's not alone anymore and they embrace.

They start seeing each other secretly, although Mike wants to tell Janette's mother so she doesn't take it badly. Janette convinces him to go to Romeo & Juliet in a nearby town. In the meantime, her teacher catches her writing him a love note but the principal decides it's unnecessary to warn Janette's mother.     

After seeing the play, the young couple have car trouble so don't arrive until early on Friday morning. Mrs. Grant catches Mike leaving Janette's room as her ankle was twisted and he had to help her in. She overreacts, ultimately she's decided to send her to Toronto the next day. 

Mike and Janette sneak off in the night, heading to Scotland to elope. The next night they stay in a small B+B with a nosey owner, who calls the newspaper in the morning. Mike knocks him out and the reporter helps them. As they go, some people help them and others don't. Finally, after losing their car and belongings, they are on foot and in sight of a bridge to Scotland when the police, the press and their parents turn up. They promise to return home if they aren't kept apart and finally they let Mike carry Janette over the border as if it were over the threshold.

Cast
 Janette Scott as Janette Grant
 Vernon Gray as Mike Pritchard
 Kay Walsh as Miss Muir
 Jack Warner as Mr. J. Pritchard
 Pamela Brown as Mrs. Grant
 Charles Victor as Farmer Gilbert
 Marjorie Rhodes as Aggie, the Farmer's wife
 Ronald Squire as Waiter
 Wilfrid Lawson as Gossage
 Sonia Dresdel as Miss Fox
 David Kossoff as Pawnbroker
 Moultrie Kelsall as Doctor
 Guy Middleton as Hector
 Michael Pertwee as Reporter
 Henry Hewitt as Jeweller
 Bryan Forbes as Frisby
 Jean Patterson as Rachel
 Harold Goodwin as Lorry driver
 Brian Wilde as Policeman
 Thora Hird as Maid
 Hattie Jacques as Woman in car with dog
 George Woodbridge as Policeman named Charlie - uncredited

Critical reception
Allmovie called the film "a very slight piece, buoyed by the charm and attractiveness of its young stars. Janette Scott and Vernon Gray...Though the film seems flat and obvious when viewed on television, it truly comes to life before a large and appreciative moviehouse audience. Forgotten for many years, Now and Forever was happily rediscovered by the late film historian William K. Everson in his 1979 book Love in the Film, which was dedicated to star Janette Scott."

References

External links

1956 films
1956 drama films
Films shot at Associated British Studios
Films directed by Mario Zampi
British drama films
1950s English-language films
1950s British films